The Man Who Made Husbands Jealous (1993) is a novel written by Jilly Cooper as part of the Rutshire Chronicles, about a womanizer who gets embroiled in a scheme to punish wayward husbands.

The book was first published in hardback in 1993 and then in paperback in April 1994, and was later adapted into a television miniseries.

Plot summary

Lysander Hawkley has a knack for trying to help the helpless, even if the helpless is a bored housewife. After his father refuses to lend him any money, his friend, Ferdie, comes up with a scheme to make money out of his womanizing: to help wives make their wandering husbands jealous. The plan, in theory, is simple: to make bored husbands realise why they had fallen in love with their wives in the first place.

Film adaptation

In 1997, a TV miniseries version was produced for ITV by Anglia Television, starring Stephen Billington as Lysander Hawkley, Hugh Bonneville as Ferdinand Fitzgerald , and Rhona Mitra as Flora Seymour.  Other cast members included Gilly Coman as the Marigold, Kim Criswell as Georgie, and Kate Byers as Kitty Rannaldini.

It was directed by Robert Knights and executive produced by Sarah Lawson, under her company Lawson Productions, and Neil Zeiger for Blue Heaven Productions. The producer was Irving Teitelbaum.

It was adapted by Harvey Bamberg and Andrew MacLear.

References

External links
Rotten Tomatoes Page

1993 British novels
Novels by Jilly Cooper
English novels
Bantam Books books